William Fisher (14 March 1940 – 6 October 2018) was a Scottish boxer. He was born in Craigneuk and boxed under the names Willie Fisher and Billy Fisher.

Boxing career

Amateur career
Fisher won the 1960 Amateur Boxing Association British light-middleweight title, when boxing out of the Craigneuk ABC. Fisher represented Great Britain at the 1960 Rome Olympic Games. He won a bronze medal at light middleweight.

Pro career
Fisher turned pro in 1961 and spent his entire career fighting in Great Britain. He retired in 1967 with a record of 21-12 with 9 KO.

External links

Olympic Profile
William Fisher's obituary

References

1940 births
2018 deaths
Sportspeople from North Lanarkshire
Light-middleweight boxers
Scottish male boxers
Olympic boxers of Great Britain
Olympic bronze medallists for Great Britain
Boxers at the 1960 Summer Olympics
Olympic medalists in boxing
Medalists at the 1960 Summer Olympics
Scottish Olympic medallists